Silsand is a village in Senja Municipality in Troms og Finnmark county, Norway. It is located on the eastern shore of the large island of Senja.

Silsand is now considered a suburb of the neighboring town of Finnsnes, which is located across the Gisundet strait on the mainland. Before the construction of the Gisund Bridge, Silsand consisted of just a few houses. With the construction of the bridge and the change in rural Norwegian demographics, the population has experienced a rapid increase since the early 1980s. Most of the new inhabitants come from other smaller villages in the Midt-Troms area.

Silsand has three schools: Småslettan skole (1-4th grade), Silsand barneskole (5-7th grade) and Silsand ungdomsskole (8-10th grade). FK Senja, a football club, is also based in Silsand, with their home field in the neighboring village of Laukhella. Storevatnet lake is located just northwest of the town.

References

Villages in Troms
Lenvik
Populated places of Arctic Norway
Senja